Samira Ahmed (born 15 June 1968) is a British journalist, writer and broadcaster at the BBC, where she has presented Radio 3's Night Waves and Radio 4's PM, The World Tonight, Sunday and Front Row and has presented the Proms for BBC Four.

Her writing has appeared in several British publications including The Guardian, The Independent, The Spectator, and New Humanist. She was a reporter and presenter on Channel 4 News from 2000 to 2011. She presented Sunday Morning Live, a topical discussion programme on BBC One from 2012 to 2013.

Early life
Ahmed was born in Wandsworth, south London, to Athar and Lalita (née Chatterjee, born 1939, Lucknow) Ahmed. Her mother is a TV presenter, actor, chef and writer on Indian cookery who previously worked for the Hindi service of the BBC World Service in Bush House as well as All India Radio in India. Samira attended Wimbledon High School, an independent day school for girls, and edited the school magazine.

Ahmed read English at St Edmund Hall, Oxford, which made her an honorary fellow in 2019. While an undergraduate she edited Isis and the Union magazines, both Oxford University student publications, and won the Philip Geddes Journalism Prize for her work on student newspapers. After graduation she completed a Postgraduate Diploma in Newspaper Journalism at City University, London. She recalls that Lucy Mathen, the first female Asian reporter on BBC television, who worked on John Craven's Newsround, was an inspirational figure for her, as was broadcaster Shyama Perera, who was working in Fleet Street at around the same time.

Journalism career

Ahmed became a BBC news trainee in 1990. After two years on attachments, she began to work as a network radio reporter in 1992 on such programmes as Today. Fearful her short BBC contract would not be renewed after a mishap in a difficult situation, Ahmed applied for, and was taken on, by BBC World for work as a presenter, which led to her becoming a reporter for Newsnight. She was the BBC's Los Angeles correspondent during 1996–97 and filed reports on the O. J. Simpson civil trial.

Ahmed joined Channel 4 News in April 2000, and became a presenter in July 2002. In June 2011 Ahmed left Channel 4, and went freelance.

In 2009 she won Broadcaster of the Year at the annual Stonewall Awards for her special report on "corrective rape" of lesbian women in South Africa. The report was made after ActionAid contacted her about their campaign against homophobic crime. She won the BBC's Celebrity Mastermind, with a specialist round on Laura Ingalls Wilder, the author of the Little House on the Prairie books, in December 2010. Again, in 2019 Ahmed won the Celebrity Mastermind Champion of Champions, she wore a Space 1999 costume.

Since October 2011, she has been a regular newspaper reviewer on Lorraine. From June 2012 to November 2013 she presented the third and fourth series of Sunday Morning Live on BBC One. In October 2012, Ahmed succeeded Ray Snoddy as presenter of Newswatch on the BBC News Channel.

She is a Visiting Professor of Journalism at Kingston University and a regular contributor to The Big Issue.

In September 2019 she interviewed Margaret Atwood about the novelist's new book The Testaments at the National Theatre, which was simulcast to more than 1,000 cinemas around the world as part of National Theatre Live.

In June 2020, BBC Four aired Art of Persia, a three-part study of the history and culture of Iran. A long time admirer of the Supermarionation works of Gerry Anderson and Sylvia Anderson, Ahmed voiced a character in the similarly produced Nebula-75. The character, Juliette Destiny, was also modelled to resemble the journalist. She reprised the role for a second episode in 2021. 

In November 2021, Ahmed interviewed Paul McCartney and poet Paul Muldoon about their book 'The Lyrics: 1956 to the Present' at the Royal Festival Hall.

Equal pay tribunal
Ahmed filed legal proceedings against the BBC under the Equality Act 2010 in October 2019. The London Central Employment Tribunal unanimously found in her favour on 10 January 2020. On 24 February 2020 it was announced that a settlement had been reached with the BBC, but no figure for this was made public.

Personal life
Ahmed lives in London and has a son and a daughter.

References

External links

Newswatch (BBC News Channel)
Front Row (BBC Radio 4)
Ahmed articles from The Guardian
Ahmed articles from Spectator

1968 births
Alumni of City, University of London
Alumni of St Edmund Hall, Oxford
BBC newsreaders and journalists
BBC World News
English people of Indian descent
ITN newsreaders and journalists
British women journalists
Living people
People educated at Wimbledon High School